Athos-Aspis is a commune in the Pyrénées-Atlantiques department in the Nouvelle-Aquitaine region of south-western France.

Geography
Athos-Aspis is located immediately to the north-west of Sauveterre-de-Béarn and just east of Abitain. Access to the commune is by the D27 road from Sauveterre-de-Béarn passing through the east of the commune and going north to Oraas. Access to the village can be by several country roads from the D27 including Arriouteque going to Lespitaou and also the Village road. Apart from the village there is the hamlet of Aspis in the south of the commune. There are significant forests in the east of the commune with the rest farmland.

The Gave d'Oloron forms the whole southern and eastern borders of the commune as it flows north to join the Gave de Pau at Peyrehorade. The Arriouyeque flows from the east of the commune through the centre to join the Gave d'Oloron on the western border. The Ruisseau de Rance rises just east of the commune and flows south-west to join the Arriouteque. The Arrec Heure forms most of the northern border of the commune as it flows west to join the Gave d'Oloron at the north-western corner of the commune.

Places and hamlets

 Aspis
 Athos
 Bouchou
 Cabé
 Les Camous
 La Campagne
 La Campagnole
 Castet
 Cossou
 Couteigt
 Desbos (barns)
 Esperben
 Gabirot
 Garampoey
 Les Garbas
 Gué
 Hau
 Herrou
 Héuré (mill)
 Houssas
 Labourdette
 Lapeyrigne
 Lapisque
 Lavielle
 Mina (côte de)
 Mouliède
 Mousquères
 Natou
 Peyrou
 Poun Agnès
 Pys
 Rioutèque
 Sarrecaute
 L'Usine

Toponymy
The commune name in béarnais is Atos-Aspins.

For Athos Michel Grosclaude proposed the patronym Ato with the Aquitaine suffix -ossum. For Aspis Michel Grosclaude proposed a Gascon etymology es pins meaning "the pines".

The following table details the origins of the commune name and other names in the commune.

Sources:

Raymond: Topographic Dictionary of the Department of Basses-Pyrenees, 1863, on the page numbers indicated in the table. 
Grosclaude: Toponymic Dictionary of communes, Béarn, 2006 
Orpustan: Jean-Baptiste Orpustan, New Basque Toponymy
Cassini: Cassini Map from 1750
Cassini2: Cassini Map from 1790

Origins:

Marca: Pierre de Marca, History of Béarn. 
Cartulary: Cartulary of the Abbey of Saint-Jean de Sorde 
Notaries: Notaries of Labastide-Villefranche
Census: Census of Béarn
Reformation: Reformation of Béarn

History
Paul Raymond noted on page 16 that in 1385 Athos had 19 fires and depended on the Bailiwick of Sauveterre as did the fief of Aspis as noted on page 15.

The villages of Athos and Aspis were united into one commune on 10 January 1842.

During the Reformation the Priest at Athos was murdered in his church and the village adopted the new ideas.

Athos is the birthplace of Athos, one of the title characters in the novel The Three Musketeers by Alexandre Dumas. The fictional Athos is named after the historical musketeer Armand de Sillègue d'Athos d'Autevielle (1615–1644), youngest son of Adrien de Sillègue, Lord of Athos and Autevielle. Autevielle is another nearby village in the commune of Autevielle-Saint-Martin-Bideren.

Administration

List of Successive Mayors

Inter-communality
The commune is part of five inter-communal structures:
 the inter-communal centre for social action of Sauveterre-de-Béarn;
 the Communauté de communes du Béarn des Gaves;
 the inter-communal association for rivers and of Saleys;
 the AEP association of Sauveterre-de-Béarn;
 the Energy association of Pyrénées-Atlantiques;

Demography
In 2017 the commune had 211 inhabitants.

From 1793 to 1836 the communes of Athos and Aspis were separate but the above table shows the total for both communes during that period.

Economy
Economic activity is mainly agricultural. The commune is part of the Appellation d'origine contrôlée (AOC) zone of Ossau-iraty.

Culture and heritage

Civil heritage
There are the houses of Lascampagnes, the consul Gourlat, and of Bouchoô the place where Monsigneur Bouchoô was born.

Aspis has a château from the 14th century facing the Gave d'Oloron with a terrace and a door to the garden. There is also the site of an old church and the old school.

At Athos there is a church of Romanesque origin in the old fief of Moliède d'Athos where there was a well-known ferry and ruins of a mill.

Religious heritage

The Church of Saint-Pierre is of Romanesque origin and contains a renaissance stoup and a Statue on the Virgin in coloured wood. Behind the Altar is the tomb of Jeanne du Peyrer "Lady of Athos and Aspis" and mother of the musketeer. The renaissance door has a stone carving from the 14th century upside down (it was probably a stone that was reused).

The cemetery has the tomb of the design engineer of the Sauveterre bridge and also that of Edmond Gourlat, consul of France and local personality.

Notable people linked to the commune
The birth of the musketeer Athos in the commune is debatable. A plaque near the church says that he was born in the Lassalle house where only parts of walls remain but the village of Autevielle also claims his birth in the fortified house of Moliède d'Athos which has some remains of strong walls.

Athos was the birthplace of Jean-Baptiste Boucho, born in the Bouchoô house in 1797, French Apostolic vicar of the Malay peninsula.

Bibliography
History of Athos and Aspis, Alexis Ichas

See also
Communes of the Pyrénées-Atlantiques department

External links
Athos-Aspis on Géoportail, National Geographic Institute (IGN) website 
Athos and Aspis on the 1750 Cassini Map

References

Communes of Pyrénées-Atlantiques